The effects of Hurricane Ivan in Florida in mid-to-late September 2004 were quite destructive, with over 14 direct deaths being caused by the storm, and at least $113 million in damage. After Ivan was a Category 5 at three separate points, the storm weakened to a Category 3 before making landfall in nearby Alabama. However, neighboring Florida still saw destructive impacts from Ivan.

Preparations
On September 9, while the hurricane was located off the coast of Venezuela, the National Hurricane Center forecasted Ivan to make landfall in southern Florida as a major hurricane within five days. As such, a mandatory evacuation was issued for all residents and visitors of the Florida Keys. According to newspaper reports, an estimated 50 percent of Monroe County residents evacuated the islands. Its forecast track shifted westward, and by September 10 it was predicted to pass near the Florida Keys before moving ashore near Cedar Key after paralleling the state's western coastline; however, uncertainty was noted. On September 12, a tropical storm watch was issued for the Florida Keys from the Dry Tortugas to Seven Mile Bridge.

In the several days prior to Ivan making its first United States landfall, forecasters predicted Ivan to move ashore between Alabama and the western Florida panhandle. About 52 hours prior to its landfall, the National Hurricane Center issued a hurricane watch from Morgan City, Louisiana to St. Marks, Florida. About 34 hours before moving ashore, the watch was replaced with a hurricane warning from Grand Isle, Louisiana to Apalachicola, Florida, with a tropical storm warning further east to Yankeetown.

Impact

Florida Keys and Southern Florida
The outer rainbands of Ivan produced a wind gust of 53 mph (86 km/h) on Key West; the winds downed some tree limbs across the Florida Keys, though the number of downed trees was limited by the passage of previous hurricanes Charley and Frances. While passing west of the area, the hurricane produced a 1 foot (0.3 m) storm tide. The mandatory evacuations prevented the delivery of products, which caused widespread fuel and food shortages at commercial establishments. As the storm moved through the region, an important Major League Baseball series between the Florida Marlins and Montreal Expos was moved to U.S. Cellular Field.

Florida Panhandle
Ivan spawned a tornado outbreak in Florida, leading to six deaths in the state. The maximum sustained winds recorded along the Florida Panhandle officially peaked at 76 mph (122 km/h) in Pensacola, though officials estimate the hurricane produced winds of Category 3 status on the Saffir-Simpson Hurricane Scale. Wind gusts unofficially reached 124 mph (201 km/h), also at Pensacola. The storm heavily damage the Escambia Bay Bridge.  The storm surge knocked a total of 58 spans off the eastbound and westbound bridges and misaligned another 66 spans, which forced the bridge to close to traffic in both directions. Rainfall totals reached  in Pensacola.

Aftermath
Over 400,000 customers in Florida lost power due to the hurricane. This became the third strong hurricane to impact Florida in 2004, the others being Hurricane Charley and Hurricane Frances. A fourth storm, Jeanne, also impacted Florida just a few days later. After Hurricane Ivan, 4,500 personnel were deployed in Florida, with 3,339 patients being treated, 2.96 million meals distributed, 56 shelters were set up, and $157 million in grants were given. They also completed over 104,000 housing inspections and distributed 97,700 tarps.

See also

 Hurricane Ivan

External links
National Hurricane Center Tropical Cyclone Report

References

Florida
September 2004 events in the United States
Effects of tropical cyclones
Tropical cyclones in 2004